The Golden Gumboot is a competition between the Far North Queensland towns of Tully, Innisfail, and Babinda in Australia for the wettest town of Australia.  These towns are located in the Wet Tropics and on land that was previously covered by rainforest. These areas experience some of the highest levels of rainfall in Australia through monsoonal rain and cyclones. The winner for the competition (since 1970) was awarded a rubber boot.

Despite the fact that Babinda has had more rainfall than Tully in the last 40 years, The Golden Gumboot monument was erected in Tully by the Tully Lions and Rotary Clubs on 10 May 2003. The project cost, including in-kind contributions, was $90,000.  The official opening took place on 10 May 2003. The boot stands at 7.9 metres (25.9 ft) and represents the record rainfall for Tully in 1950.  The boot is composed of fibreglass and has a spiral staircase to the top of the boot that allows a view of the town. Historical photographs of floods in the district are displayed on the walls inside the boot for visitors to view as they climb to the top.  The Gumboot was designed, fabricated and installed by Brian Newell.

Tully holds a Golden Gumboot Festival annually.

The Golden Gumboot was closed after Cyclone Yasi in 2011, but was reopened early in 2012 by Andrew Fraser, the Acting Premier of Queensland. Restoration was funded through an insurance claim and a $20,000 donation.

See also
Australia's big things
Big Dreamers

References

External links
Australian Traveller - Golden Gumboot

Big things in Queensland
Fiberglass sculptures in Australia
Ironic and humorous awards
Wet Tropics of Queensland
Buildings and structures completed in 2003
Boots
Rain